Alfred Joseph Andrews (24 April 1865 – 31 January 1950) was a Canadian politician serving as an alderman and the 17th Mayor of Winnipeg.

Andrews was a lawyer who moved to Winnipeg in 1880. He became a Winnipeg alderman in 1884 and served in that role until his election as Mayor for 1898 and 1899. He was the founding member of the Citizens' Committee of 1000.

The City of Winnipeg named Andrews Street in his honour.

References

External links
 When The State Trembled: How A.J. Andrews and the Citizens' Committee Broke the Winnipeg General Strike by Reinhold Kramer and Tom Mitchell

1865 births
1950 deaths
Lawyers in Manitoba
Mayors of Winnipeg
People from Montérégie